Panama competed in the 2008 Summer Olympics which was held in Beijing, People's Republic of China from August 8 to August 24, 2008.  Yesika Jimenez was the delegation's flagbearer at the Opening Ceremony.

Panama's participation was initially uncertain.  The country was suspended by the International Olympic Committee in July 2007, due to what was described as government interference in Panama's National Olympic Committee.  The suspension was lifted in April 2008, enabling the country's athletes to compete for qualification at the Beijing Games.

Medalists

Athletics

Men
Track & road events

Field events

Fencing

Jesika Jiménez represented Panama.

Women

Swimming 

Men

Women

See also
 Panama at the 2007 Pan American Games
 Panama at the 2010 Central American and Caribbean Games

References

Nations at the 2008 Summer Olympics
2008
Olympics